Love Supreme is a 1988 compilation album by The Supremes, released on the Motown label. The album peaked at number ten in the UK and was awarded a silver disc for sales in excess of 60,000 copies.

Track listing

Side one
"You Can't Hurry Love"
"Stop! In the Name of Love"
"Baby Love"
"Come See About Me"
"The Happening"
"I'm Gonna Make You Love Me" (with The Temptations)
"Automatically Sunshine"
"Love Child"
"Up the Ladder to the Roof"
"I'm Livin' in Shame"

Side two
"Stoned Love"
"Floy Joy"
"Where Did Our Love Go"
"You Keep Me Hangin' On"
"Love Is Here and Now You're Gone"
"I Second That Emotion" (with The Temptations)
"Reflections"
"Nathan Jones"
"In and Out of Love"
"Someday We'll Be Together"

Personnel
Diana Ross: vocals
Mary Wilson: vocals
Florence Ballard: vocals
Cindy Birdsong: vocals
Jean Terrell: vocals
The Temptations (Melvin Franklin, Eddie Kendricks, Paul Williams, Otis Williams, Dennis Edwards): vocals
The Andantes (Jackie Hicks, Marlene Barrow and Louvain Demps): background vocals
Maxine Waters: background vocals
Julia Waters: background vocals
Clyde King: background vocals
Johnny Bristol: background vocals

Chart history

Certifications

References

1988 compilation albums
The Supremes compilation albums
Motown compilation albums